Richard Briffault is an American legal scholar. He is the Joseph P. Chamberlain Professor of Legislation at Columbia Law School.

Biography 
Briffault earned a bachelor's degree from Columbia University in 1974. During his undergraduate studies, Briffault served as managing editor of the Columbia Daily Spectator. He graduated from Harvard Law School in 1977.

Briffault subsequently clerked for Shirley Hufstedler, worked for Hugh Carey, and joined the law firm Paul, Weiss, Rifkind, Wharton & Garrison. Briffault began teaching at Columbia Law School in 1983, and was later named the Joseph P. Chamberlain Professor of Legislation. His specialty is constitutional law, government regulation, and election law.

From 2014 to 2020, he served as Chairman of the New York City Conflicts of Interest Board.

Personal life and family 
He married Canadian economist Sherry Glied in 1993. Glied currently serves as the Dean of New York University's Robert F. Wagner Graduate School of Public Service.

References

Columbia Law School faculty
Columbia College (New York) alumni
Harvard Law School alumni
Living people
Year of birth missing (living people)
21st-century American lawyers
20th-century American lawyers
New York (state) lawyers
American legal scholars